Mykolaivka is a city of district significance and administrative centre of Mykolaivka urban hromada in Sloviansk Raion, Donetsk Oblast (province) of Ukraine to the south of the railway station Elektrychna. The city is most known for being the home of the Sloviansk Thermal Power Plant, where it is a major employer of local residents.

On 4 July 2014, Ukrainian forces secured the city from pro-Russian separatists. The hospital began renovations in 2015, having been damaged in the fighting, with pro-Russian militants positioned around the building and on its roof. In 2016, the Verkhovna Rada appropriated the status of the city of district significance, withdrew it from the composition of the Sloviansk municipality and included it in the Sloviansk Raion.

Gallery

References

External links

Cities in Donetsk Oblast
Kramatorsk Raion
Cities of district significance in Ukraine
Populated places established in the Russian Empire
Kharkov Governorate